The Ford Model C is a car that was produced from 1934 until 1937 by Ford UK in Dagenham. It had an 1172 cc (71.5 ci) four-cylinder sidevalve engine delivering . It was the big brother to the smaller Ford Y, which had a 933 cc (57 ci) engine. The styling was inspired by the 1934 Ford V8, only smaller. The Model C was also built by Ford Germany, where it was named the Ford Eifel after the mountain range near Cologne, and it was sold from 1934 to 1940.

The British line was named Ten (for 10 British fiscal horsepower). 

In 1935, the grille and bonnet (hood) on the British line was facelifted and the mark was changed to CX.

In 1937, the body was upgraded again and the design of the British and German product lines became more different. The German line was still named Eifel. The British equivalent was named the Model 7W.

References

External links
 http://www.fordyandcmodelregister.co.uk/

See also
 Ford Motor Company

Model C
1930s cars
Cars introduced in 1934
1940s cars

de:Ford Modell C
it:Ford Model C (UK / D)